Complexul Sportiv Raional Orhei is a football stadium in Moldova founded in 1980. In 2005 began the demolition of the old wooden stand, to make way for a new building, modern. Orhei sports complex, along with those of Zimbru and Sheriff, is one of the most modern in the country.

It is also used by the Moldova national rugby union team.

References

External links
Official site  

Football venues in Moldova
Orhei
Multi-purpose stadiums
FC Milsami Orhei